This is list of members of the Argentine Senate from 10 December 2001 to 9 December 2003.

Composition
as of 9 December 2003

Senate leadership

Election cycles 
For the first time since 1973, all seats in the Argentine Senate were renewed in the 2001 legislative election, following the implementation of a new system as per the 1994 constitutional amendment. Under the new system, a third of all seats were renewed for two year-terms (2001–2003), another third for four-year terms (2001–2005), and another third for full six-year terms (2001–2007). Which province was allocated two-year, four-year, or six-year terms was decided by draw. Accordingly, all of the senators listed here were elected in 2001.

List of senators

Notes

References

External links
List on the official website (archived) 

2001-2003
2001 in Argentina
2002 in Argentina
2003 in Argentina